Route 13, also known as Witless Bay Line, is a , uncontrolled-access highway in  Newfoundland and Labrador. Its western terminus is at Route 1 (TCH) in Holyrood and its eastern terminus is at Route 10 in Witless Bay. The route travels a generally straight line through the centre of Avalon Peninsula and is completely in Division No. 1.

The entire route Route 13 is rural, with no other major communities or services of any kind along its length.

Major intersections

See also

References

013